Love an Adventure is the second studio album by Australian new wave band Pseudo Echo, released in 1985 by EMI Australia. The album peaked at No. 14 in Australia and produced three Australian top twenty singles, including "Don’t Go", which peaked at No. 4.

In 1987, an alternate version of the album featuring re-recorded vocals and several different tracks

Background
Following the success of Autumnal Park, Pseudo Echo returned to the studio in 1985, with an altered line up. Tony Lugton and Anthony Argiro both left and joined other bands. They were replaced by brothers James Leigh and Vince Leigh (aka Vincent Dingli).

Critical reception
In a retrospective review for AllMusic, critic Michael Sutton gave the album 4 out of 5 stars, and wrote of the album, "Their cover of Lipps Inc.'s ‘’Funkytown’’ was sadly misrepresentative of the album's stylish, hook-loaded dance rock. Pseudo Echo want people to move their feet and this album is stocked with dancefloor scorchers such as "Living in a Dream", "Listening" and the funky "Try". "Funkytown" may have given Pseudo Echo a glimpse of commercial success, but the rest of Love an Adventure proved that they were capable of more."

Track listing
 Australian Vinyl/Cassette 

North American & European version 

 North American cassette version does not include "Funky Town" but includes "Don't Go".

Chart positions

Weekly charts

Certifications

Personnel
Brian Canham – lead and backing vocals, electric guitars
Pierre Gigliotti – synthesizer, bass guitar, backing vocals
James Leigh – keyboards, synthesizers, drum machine, sequencer, backing vocals
Vince Leigh – acoustic drums, electronic drums, backing vocals

Additional musicians
 Alex Pertout – percussions
 James Valentine – saxophone
 Greg Flood – trombone
 Peter Salt – trumpet

References

External links
 

1985 albums
1987 albums
EMI Records albums
Pseudo Echo albums